Gary Walker Jr. (born May 10, 1991) is an American football free safety who is currently a free agent. He was signed by the Baltimore Ravens as an undrafted free agent in 2013. He played college football for the University of Idaho.

Professional career

Baltimore Ravens
On May 8, 2013, he signed with the Baltimore Ravens as an undrafted free agent. On August 13, 2013, he was cut by the Ravens.

External links
Idaho Vandals bio
Baltimore Ravens bio

References

1991 births
Living people
Idaho Vandals football players
Baltimore Ravens players
People from Rialto, California